Although not clearly defined, the backlog of unexamined patent applications consists, at one point in time, of all the patent applications that have been filed and still remain to be examined. The backlog was said to be 4.2 million worldwide in 2007, and in 2009 it reportedly continued to grow. Alone, the United States Patent and Trademark Office (USPTO) was reported to have, in 2009, a backlog of more than 700,000 patent applications.

Analysis
According to Beth Simone Noveck,
 According to former U.S. federal judge Paul R. Michel, in an interview conducted in 2011, "delay is [...] the greatest problem with the [U.S.] patent system" and "[the USPTO] desperately needs thousands of additional examiners and new IT systems. Indeed, it has needed them for years."

A study published in 2019 found that an USPTO examiners spend on average only 19 hours on each patent application. This time includes reading it, searching prior art, comparing the two, writing office actions, replying to applicants’ counter-arguments, and, often, conducting interviews with applicants and their attorneys. At the same time the voluminosity of (the number of words in) patent applications keeps increasing due to legislative and judicial changes that demand greater disclosure. A study of 10,000 patent applications filed with the USPTO in January 2002 found that the grant rate of individual examiners increases with the length of their tenure. More experienced examiners also cite fewer prior art references. Another study examined a sample of patent families that had applications allowed by the USPTO and rejected by the European Patent Office (EPO), and concluded that more experienced US examiners are more likely to allow such undeserving applications than novice examiners.

A study published in 2021 disputed earlier findings that more experienced USPTO examiners are less scrupulous. Instead, the authors claim that more experienced examiners are more likely to use examiner's amendments, where the examiner writes her own claims that she is willing to allow, rather than simply rejecting the claims presented by the applicant. If the applicant accepts such examiner's amendments, the patent can be issued after the first Office action, thus reducing the patent pendency more than threefold.

The backlog problem exists in many other patent offices, although usually it is less severe than at the USPTO. For example, Alison Brimelow, former president of the EPO, stated that the "backlog of patent applications is counter-productive to legal certainty, and that has a negative effect on the innovation process". According to a 2010 study by London School of Economics, "the cost to the global economy of the delay in processing patent applications may be as much as £7.65 billion each year."

Causes 
Only a very small number of studies looked into the causes of the patent backlog at the USPTO. In 2014 Frakes and Wasserman found that the examination fees paid by the applicants cover no more than 30% of the USPTO budget, since 1991 when the Agency became “almost entirely user-fee financed”. As a result, the USPTO budget depends strongly on issuance and maintenance fees, and “upon the occurrence of a negative financial shock to the PTO's financial health, the PTO begins to extend preferential examination-queuing treatment to those technologies that cost the Agency the least to examine.”

The "back end" funding scheme (i.e. mostly from maintenance and issuance  fees, rather than from "front end" examination fees), creates a financial imbalance at the USPTO. In response to this challenge, the  examiners tend to spend less time on the examination, to cite fewer references, to allow (rather than reject) patent applications, to demand splitting original application into numerous divisionals (each of these divisionals charges a separate set fees, even though the content(text) of each application in the family, that the examiner reads, is the same). Nevertheless, the USPTO budget remains constrained, and does not allow for hiring more examiners to clear up the backlog.

Solutions 
Since 2006, a number of examination collaborations, known as Patent Prosecution Highway (PPH), have been set up between various patent offices, in order to avoid the duplication of search and examination work and, hopefully, to reduce the patent backlog. Also, several national patent offices, including United States Patent and Trademark Office (USPTO), implemented programs for prioritized examination of patent applications in narrow categories or for patents applied by small firms. Some of these programs have been found to benefit small firms in terms of patent citations and quality; however, possibly because of a higher market value, such prioritized patents were found to be more likely litigated later.

However, many patent applicants can sometimes prefer a lengthy 'patent pending' period and the legal uncertainty that it brings. Also, since May 29, 2000, the USPTO has the policy to allow for a patent term extension beyond 20 years from the non-provisional priority date in cases when it takes the Office more than 3 years to issue a patent. Such policy encourages applicants not to use or demand accelerated examinations, as the term extension is added to the end of the patent life, i.e. when the patent is likely to be the most valuable (high sales are achieved).

See also
Patent prosecution

References

Further reading
 – discussing the length of examination proceedings

Patent law